The Colonial School District is a public school district in New Castle Hundred, Delaware. The district offices are located at 318 East Basin Road, in Wilmington Manor, with a New Castle postal address. The superintendent as of 2020 is Dr. Jeffrey Menzer, Ed. D.

In addition to New Castle and Wilmington Manor it includes Delaware City, Port Penn, St. Georges,  portions of Wilmington, and half of Bear. Of the four territorial school districts to serve Wilmington, Colonial is the only one which does not operate schools in the Wilmington city limits.

Schools

 High schools
William Penn High School

 Middle schools
Calvin R. McCullough Middle School
George Read Middle School
Gunning Bedford Middle School

 Elementary schools
Castle Hills Elementary School
Carrie Downie Elementary School
Colwyck Elementary School
Harry O. Eisenberg Elementary School
New Castle Elementary School
Pleasantville Elementary School
Southern Elementary School
Wilmington Manor Elementary School
Kathleen H. Wilbur Elementary School

References

External links
 

New Castle, Delaware
Education in Wilmington, Delaware
School districts established in 1981
School districts in New Castle County, Delaware
1981 establishments in Delaware